is a passenger railway station located in the city of Anan, Tokushima Prefecture, Japan. It is operated by JR Shikoku and has the station number "M13".

Lines
Only local trains stop at the station.

Layout
The station, which is unstaffed, consists of a side platform serving a single track. There is no station building, only a shelter on the platform for waiting passengers. A ramp leads up to the platform from the access road.

Adjacent stations

History
The station building was destroyed in a fire in the summer of 1986. On 1 April 1987, with the privatization of Japanese National Railways (JNR), the successor of JGR, JR Shikoku took over control of the Station.

Passenger statistics
In fiscal 2019, the station was used by an average of 614 passengers daily.

Surrounding area
 Anan City Minobayashi Elementary School
 Anan City Anan Junior High School
 Anan National College of Technology

See also
List of railway stations in Japan

References

External links

 JR Shikoku timetable

Railway stations in Tokushima Prefecture
Railway stations in Japan opened in 1936
Anan, Tokushima